This is a list of former hotels in Manhattan, New York City.

Former hotels in Manhattan

 995 Fifth Avenue 
 The Ansonia 
 Astor House 
 Barbizon-Plaza Hotel
 City Hotel
 Dauphin Hotel 
 DoubleTree by Hilton Hotel Metropolitan New York City
 Drake Hotel 
 Endicott Hotel 
 Fifth Avenue Hotel 
 George Washington Hotel 
 Grand Central Hotel 
 Grand Hotel 
 Hotel Astor 
 Hotel Kenmore Hall 
 Hotel McAlpin 
 Hotel Metropole 
 Hotel Pennsylvania
 Hotel Pierrepont 
 Hotel St. Moritz 
 Hotel Theresa
 Metropolitan Hotel 
 New York Biltmore Hotel 
 New York Marriott East Side
 Pabst Hotel 
 The Roosevelt Hotel
 Savoy-Plaza Hotel
 Sinclair House 
 Stanhope Hotel 995 Fifth Avenue 
 Marriott World Trade Center
 Universal Hotel 
 Weylin Hotel 
 Waldorf-Astoria
 Windsor Hotel

See also

 List of hotels in New York City
 Lists of hotels – an index of hotel list articles on Wikipedia

 
Manhattan Former
Hotels In Manhattan